Julio César Salas Morales (born August 18, 1994, in Navojoa, Sonora) is a professional Mexican footballer who last played for Pacific F.C.

References

External links
 

1994 births
Living people
Association football midfielders
Santos Laguna footballers
Tampico Madero F.C. footballers
Irapuato F.C. footballers
Ascenso MX players
Liga Premier de México players
Tercera División de México players
Footballers from Sonora
People from Navojoa
Mexican footballers